Jacob Juel (1744 – 21 April 1800) was a Norwegian timber trader and civil servant. He was born in Christiania as the son of timber trader and civil servant Hans Juel and Else Sophie Dorothea Rasch. He was the brother of Maren Juel. He was assigned the title of Zahlkasserer in 1774. He also owned large land properties and a shipyard. He was arrested in 1784, after a deficience in the cash balance of 556,000 Rdlr, but eventually managed to escape and later lived in exile in Sweden.

References

1744 births
1800 deaths
Juel family
Businesspeople from Oslo
18th-century Norwegian businesspeople
Norwegian businesspeople in timber
Norwegian civil servants
Norwegian prisoners sentenced to life imprisonment
Escapees from Norwegian detention
Norwegian expatriates in Sweden
People convicted in absentia